Pseudemoia cryodroma, also known commonly as the alpine bog skink, is a species of lizard in the family Scincidae. The species is endemic to Victoria in Australia.

Habitat
The preferred natural habitats of P. cryodroma are freshwater wetlands, grassland, shrubland, and forest, at altitudes of at least .

Reproduction
P. cryodroma is viviparous.

Hybridization
P. cryodroma is known to hybridize with two other species in its genus, P. entrecasteauxii and P. pagenstecheri.

References

Further reading
Cogger HG (2014). Reptiles and Amphibians of Australia, Seventh Edition. Clayton, Victoria, Australia: CSIRO Publishing. xxx + 1,033 pp. .
Hutchinson MN, Donnellan SC (1992). "Taxonomy and genetic variation in the Australian lizards of the genus Pseudemoia (Scincidae: Lygosominae)". Journal of Natural History 26 (1): 215–264. (Pseudemoia cryodroma, new species, p. 245).
Wilson, Steve; Swan, Gerry (2013). A Complete Guide to Reptiles of Australia, Fourth Edition. Sydney: New Holland Publishers. 522 pp. .

Pseudemoia
Reptiles described in 1992
Skinks of Australia
Endemic fauna of Australia
Taxa named by Mark Norman Hutchinson
Taxa named by Steve Donnellan (scientist)